Odeon Bërdufi (born 20 October 1990 in Tirana) is an Albanian footballer who currently plays as a forward for Korabi.

References

External links

1990 births
Living people
Footballers from Tirana
Albanian footballers
Association football forwards
FK Dinamo Tirana players
KF Adriatiku Mamurrasi players
FK Kukësi players
KF Laçi players
KS Iliria players
KS Sopoti Librazhd players
KS Turbina Cërrik players
KS Burreli players
FK Vora players
KF Turbina players
KF Korabi Peshkopi players